Ludgershall railway station was a railway station which served the town of Ludgershall in Wiltshire, England from 1882 to 1961.

History
The station was opened on 1 May 1882, on the Swindon, Marlborough and Andover Railway By 1894, the operator was the Midland and South Western Junction Railway. running services between Cheltenham and Southampton. In 1901, a branch from Ludgershall was built to serve Tidworth Camp, carrying military personnel, and was open to the public passengers in 1902. In 1943 a short spur was added to serve the military depot at Ludgershall, to the south of the main road.

As a whole, traffic on the M&SWJR fell steeply after the Second World War and Ludgershall Station closed to passengers in 1961, along with the northern section of the line up to Swindon, while the branch to Tidworth closed to passengers in 1955, and fully closed in 1963. The spur at Ludgershall and line south to  remain open, to allow the Army to transport tanks and other equipment to and from the depot, until its closure in 2015, and onwards to the Salisbury Plain Training Area. There is a level crossing on Tidworth Road.

Possible reopening
Ludgershall Town Council and the pressure group Railfuture have been campaigning for the line between Ludgershall and Andover to be reopened for passenger services, due to the massive growth in population in Tidworth.

Routes

References

Disused railway stations in Wiltshire
Former Midland and South Western Junction Railway stations
Railway stations in Great Britain opened in 1882
Railway stations in Great Britain closed in 1961